The -cent coin minted in the Netherlands during World War II was made of zinc, and worth , or .025, of the Dutch guilder. It was designed by Nico de Haas, a Dutch national-socialist, and struck in 1941 and 1942.

Mintage

References

Netherlands in World War II
Coins of the Netherlands
Modern obsolete currencies
Currencies of Europe
Zinc and aluminum coins minted in Germany and occupied territories during World War II